The 2015–16 Botola, also known as Botola Maroc Telecom for sponsorship reasons, is the 59th season of the Premier League, the top Moroccan professional league for association football clubs, since its establishment in 1915. The fixtures were announced on 22 July 2015. The season started on 5 September 2015 and is scheduled to conclude on 15 April 2016.

Wydad came into the season as defending champions of the 2014–15 season. IR Tanger and MC Oujda entered as the two promoted teams from the 2014–15 GNF 2.

On June 5th 2016, FUS Rabat won the football championship after a 4-2 victory against Mouloudia D'Oujda. The FUS Rabat club won the championship for the first time after being runner-up to the title for 5 previous times.

Teams
A total of 16 teams compete in the league, including 14 sides from the 2014–15 season and two promoted from the 2014–15 GNF 2. On 12 April 2015, Tanger became the first Championship side to be promoted following their 0–0 draw over Youssoufia Berrechid in week 27. On 4 May 2015 (in week 30), MC Oujda got promoted to the top flight after defeating US Temara 1-0 in their home match.

The two promoted clubs replaced Chabab Atlas Khenifra and Ittihad Khemisset.

Stadium and locations

Number of teams by regions

Personnel and kits 

 1 According to current revision of List of Moroccan Football League managers
 Additionally, referee kits are made by Adidas.
 Maroc Telecom is a sponsor for all the league's teams.

Managerial changes

Results

League table

Result table

Season statistics

Scoring

Top scorers

Hat-tricks 

4 Player scored four goals5 Player scored five goals(H) - Home ; (A) - Away

Annual awards 
The Royal Moroccan Football Federation, in coordination with the LNFP ( Ligue Nationale du Football Professionnel) and the UMFP (Union Marocaine des Footballeurs Professionnels), organized the 2nd edition of the "Stars' Night" in honor of the players and coacheswho were distinguished during the 2015/2016 season.

See also
2015–16 GNF 2
2016 CAF Champions League
2016 CAF Confederation Cup

References

External links

Fédération Royale Marocaine de Football

Botola seasons
Morocco
1